Symmachus is a name from Roman antiquity. It may refer to:

 Symmachus (translator) (late 2nd century), author of one of the Greek versions of the Old Testament
 Symmachus ben Joseph, a Jewish Tanna sage of the fifth generation
 Symmachus (consul 522), son of Boethius
 Pope Symmachus, bishop of Rome from 498 to 514
 Symmachi, a Roman aristocratic family
 Aurelius Valerius Tullianus Symmachus, consul in 330
 Lucius Aurelius Avianius Symmachus, praefectus urbi in 364–365
 Quintus Aurelius Symmachus (c. 340–c. 402), orator, author, and politician, the most influential of the Symmachi
 Quintus Fabius Memmius Symmachus (383/384 – after 402), praetor
 Quintus Aurelius Symmachus, consul in 446
 Quintus Aurelius Memmius Symmachus (died 526), consul in 485 and wrote a history of Rome